John L. Simpson (born 2 September 1963) is an Australian film and theatre producer and distributor.

Early life
Simpson was born on September 2, 1963 in Sydney, Australia. He majored in acting at the University of Western Sydney, and also achieved a Master of Screen Arts and Business from Australian Film Television and Radio School.

Career 
Simpson first began his career as an actor and performed in various stage productions such as Les Misérables and Phantom of the Opera. He later began working as a theater producer in 1991 with the play My Black Heart. Simpson then moved into producing films such as Men's Group, his first independent film. He has become a regular speaker on low budget filmmaking models in Australia and is a current advisor to several film labs across the country, including the SA FilmLAB and Screen ACT’s Low Budget Feature Film Initiative. Simpson was also a board member of Screen Canberra from 2013 to 2017.

Titan View 
In July 2007 Simpson founded the distribution company Titan View, which he formed in order to distribute the film The Jammed. Simpson mortgaged his house to create the company and distribute the film, which became the third highest-grossing screen average for an Australian film of all time during its first few weeks of release. Simpson received an AFI Fellowship in 2008 to tour the film Men's Group around Australia. The company has also received funding from Screen Australia in 2010 as part of their Innovative Distribution Funding project.

Filmography

Awards 
 2007 Digispaa, Won Spaartan Award
 2008 Inside Film Award Won - Best Film (Men's Group)
 2008 Inside Film Award Won - Best script (Men's Group)

References

External links 
 https://www.youtube.com/watch?v=8rib-qsLjmo
 https://www.imdb.com/name/nm2035673/
 http://www.titanview.com

1963 births
Living people